The Roman Catholic Diocese of Ciudad del Este is a diocese of the Roman Catholic Church based in the city of Ciudad del Este, in the Ecclesiastical Province of Asunción in Paraguay.

History
 On March 25, 1968, the Territorial Prelature of Alto Paraná was established from the Territorial Prelature of Encarnación y Alto Paraná
 On July 10, 1993, the territorial prelature was established as the Diocese of Alto Paraná
 On February 3, 2001, the diocese as renamed as the Diocese of Ciudad del Este

The diocese became noted in 2014 due to the ouster of its bishop, Rogelio Ricardo Livieres Plano, by Pope Francis for his alleged promotion of a priest of the diocese who had been accused of the sexual abuse of a minor while serving in the United States. Livieres was then barred from presiding at public celebrations of the Mass. Since then, accusations of major financial mismanagement of the finances of the diocese by Livieres have also surfaced, with the diocese reportedly close to a million United States dollars in debt.

Bishops

Ordinaries, in reverse chronological order
 Bishops of Ciudad del Este (Latin Church), below
 Heinz Wilhelm Steckling, O.M.I. (15 November 2014 – )
 Rogelio Ricardo Livieres Plano, Opus Dei (July 12, 2004 – September 25, 2014)
 Ignacio Gogorza Izaguirre, S.C.I. (February 3, 2001 – July 12, 2004), appointed Bishop of Encarnación
 Bishops of Alto Paraná (Latin Church), below
 Oscar Páez Garcete (July 10, 1993 – February 5, 2000)
 Prelates of Alto Paraná (Latin Church), below
 Pastor Cuquejo, C.Ss.R. (later Archbishop of Asunción) (April 19, 1990 – May 5, 1992), appointed Bishop of Paraguay, Military
 Augustín Van Aaken, S.V.D. (July 25, 1972 – April 19, 1990)
 Francisco Cedzich, S.V.D. (May 11, 1968 – December 23, 1971)

Auxiliary bishop
Pedro Collar Noguera (2016-2017), appointed Bishop of San Juan Bautista de las Misiones

References

 GCatholic.org
 Catholic Hierarchy

Roman Catholic dioceses in Paraguay
Christian organizations established in 1968
Ciudad del Este
Roman Catholic dioceses and prelatures established in the 20th century
Ciudad del Este, Roman Catholic Diocese of